Jessica Kathryn Burton (born 17 August 1982) is an English author and actress. , she has published four novels, The Miniaturist, The Muse, The Confession, The House of Fortune and two books for children, The Restless Girls and Medusa. All four adult novels were Sunday Times best-sellers, with The Miniaturist, The Muse and The House of Fortune reaching no. 1, and both The Miniaturist and The Muse were New York Times best-sellers, and Radio 4's Books at Bedtime. Collectively her novels have been published in almost 40 languages. Her short stories have been published in Harpers Bazaar US and Stylist.

Burton is also a non-fiction writer. Her essays have been published in The Wall Street Journal, The Independent, Vogue, Elle, Red, Grazia, Lonely Planet Traveller and The Spectator.

Early life and career
Burton studied at Lady Margaret School, Brasenose College, Oxford, and the Central School of Speech and Drama.

Burton's work in theatre includes The Hour We Knew Nothing of Each Other at the National Theatre, London in 2008. As well as working as an author and actress, Burton has worked as a personal assistant in the City of London.

Writing career
Burton's 2014 debut novel The Miniaturist is set in 17th-century Amsterdam. The novel is inspired by Petronella Oortman's dollhouse now at the Rijksmuseum, although it does not otherwise attempt to be a biographical novel. The Miniaturist took over four years to write. It was the subject of a bidding war at the April 2013 London Book Fair. It was adapted as a two-part miniseries for the BBC and PBS Masterpiece in 2017.

Burton's second novel, The Muse, was published in 2016 and is set in a dual time-frame, during the Spanish Civil War and 30 years later in 1960s London. It was nominated for the 2016 Books Are My Bag Readers' Awards.

Burton's first novel for children, The Restless Girls, was published in September 2018. The story is based on the Brothers Grimm tale, The Twelve Dancing Princesses.

Her third novel for adults, The Confession, was published in 2019. Medusa, her second book for children, was published in 2021.

The House of Fortune, a sequel to The Miniaturist, was published in 2022.

Works
Adult novels
 The Miniaturist (Picador, 2014)
 The Muse (Picador, 2016)
 The Confession (Picador, 2019)
 The House of Fortune (Picador, 2022)

Children's books
 The Restless Girls (Bloomsbury, 2018)
 Medusa (Bloomsbury, 2021)

Awards and recognitions
 2014 Waterstones "Book of the Year" winner for The Miniaturist
 2014 Specsavers National Book Awards: New Writer of the Year for The Miniaturist
 2014 Specsavers National Book Awards: Book of the Year for The Miniaturist

References

External links
 

1982 births
Living people
21st-century English novelists
English stage actresses
English television actresses
English radio actresses
21st-century English actresses
English women novelists
21st-century English women writers
Alumni of the Royal Central School of Speech and Drama
Alumni of Brasenose College, Oxford
Writers from London
Actresses from London
People educated at Lady Margaret School